We Are Not Alone is the second studio album by American Christian rock band StorySide:B. It was released in the USA on June 19, 2007, on Gotee Records.

Track listing
"Fall Down" – 3:19
"Tell Me What You Think of God" – 3:30
"Be Still" – 3:50
"All Along" – 3:36
"Demons and Angels" – 3:37
"Don't Let It Go" – 3:10
"That Is Love" – 3:44
"Sister" – 3:47
"I Give You Me" – 4:15
"For You" – 3:10

References

2007 albums
StorySide:B albums